Michel Robert (24 December 1948, Corbelin) is a leading French international Grand Prix show jumping equestrian. He was born on 24 December 1948 in Corbelin. Michel Robert started riding at the age of four on a sheep, complete with saddle and bridle. He advocates a style of riding based on "respect for and harmony with the horse." He began his career in eventing, and later specialized in show jumping. In October 2013, he announced his decision to retire from Grand Prix level competition.

On January 1, 2014, he was awarded the French Legion of Honour. He was the final winner of the Global Champions Tour for 2009. He is a three-time Olympic equestrian.

References

External links 
 The International Equestrian Federation's biographical data for Michel Robert

French show jumping riders
French male equestrians
1948 births
Living people
Equestrians at the 1972 Summer Olympics
Equestrians at the 1988 Summer Olympics
Equestrians at the 1992 Summer Olympics
Olympic medalists in equestrian
Medalists at the 1992 Summer Olympics
Medalists at the 1988 Summer Olympics
Olympic bronze medalists for France